The rivalry between American actor Sylvester Stallone and Austrian-American actor Arnold Schwarzenegger went on for about 20 years, often involving incidents of one-upsmanship and subterfuge from both parties.

History
The two actors first met each other in the 1977 Golden Globe ceremony, where Stallone had been nominated for Best Actor, while Schwarzenegger was nominated for New Star of the Year. Due to an event in the ceremony, Stallone allegedly threw a bowl of flowers at Schwarzenegger. Stallone later spoke out in an interview with Variety, saying that Schwarzenegger laughed at him when he lost the award to Schwarzenegger. He said that "from that moment even our DNA hated each other".

The rival actors attacked each other in the press, and tried to surpass the other with more on-screen killings and larger weapons. In an October 1985 interview with the now-defunct The News of the World, Schwarzenegger disses Stallone (who was a much bigger star at the time) with a lie, presumably with the intent to bait Stallone into a beef: "I’d be angry at hearing my name mentioned in the same breath as Stallone’s. Stallone uses body doubles for some of the close-ups in his movies. I don’t".

In November 1985, Rocky IV, starring Stallone, opens with a $20 million weekend, with Rocky's rival—who has a foreign accent reminiscent of Schwarzenegger— perceived to be a facsimile of Schwarzenegger.

In December 1985, Stallone married Brigitte Nielsen. As told by Vulture:

In a January 1988 interview with Playboy, Schwarzenegger mocks Stallone's fur coat that he wears while directing; he additionally claimed Stallone was out of touch with the women's movement and "just gives off the wrong vibrations."

In February 1988, The News of the World runs a story by journalist Wendy Leigh with the headline: “Hollywood Star’s Nazi Secret.” The article claims Schwarzenegger is a closet Hitler-lover with “fervent Nazi and anti-Semitic views.” His father, Gustav, the article alleges, was personally responsible for rounding up Jews to put them in concentration camps. Leigh’s source was claimed to be Stallone. While it's true that Schwarzenegger's father did indeed voluntarily apply to join the Austrian National Socialist Party on 1 March 1938 and held allegiance to Nazi Germany during World War II, there's no evidence to support Gustav rounded up Jews or had any knowledge of—or participated in—concentration camps or other war crimes. Gustav Schwarzenegger's Nazi links were revealed in 1990, two years after the accusation; however, Arnold, who was born two years after the fall of the regime, has always fervently denounced the Nazi regime.

Many of the jabs were downright petty. In September 1988, the New York Post reported that Stallone and his crew entered a nightclub, saw a picture of Schwarzenegger on the wall, and demanded its removal, lest Sly leave and never come back. The owner took down the picture.

In March 1990, Stallone read an unauthorized biography by the aforementioned Wendy Leigh about Schwarzenegger’s Nazi family, difficult childhood, and use of steroids in his teens. Stallone, according to Leigh, was so pleased after reading the first draft that he said: “Honey, reading this is better than getting four blow jobs”. Schwarzenegger has subsequently admitted to taking steroids while bodybuilding, and he also mentioned his father was indeed an abusive alcoholic.

In Twins, Schwarzenegger's character makes fun of a Rambo poster that he sees on the wall, implying with a hand gesture that he had bigger muscles than Stallone's depiction of Rambo. Stallone responded in the movie Tango & Cash, in which he beat up a man who looked like Schwarzenegger. Stallone later admitted that he imagined Schwarzenegger while shooting the scene. In Last Action Hero, a Terminator 2 poster was shown with Stallone’s face, and Schwarzenegger's character compliments his performance in a tongue-in-cheek manner.

In an interview with Jimmy Fallon, Stallone stated that Schwarzenegger once tricked him to do a terrible movie: Stop! Or My Mom Will Shoot.  Schwarzenegger later admitted that it was true in an interview with Jimmy Kimmel.  

Schwarzenegger said: 

The rivalry ended in the late 1990s when both actors' impact on the box office had reduced significantly. At the turn of the millennium, The Hollywood Reporter said that the pair were ideating a joint acting venture. Schwarzenegger also invited Stallone for multiple inaugurations during his time as the Governor of California; as a gesture of goodwill, Stallone had donated $15,000 to Schwarzenegger's re-election campaign in 2005. The pair also starred in three movies together: The Expendables 2, The Expendables 3 and Escape Plan. Additionally, Schwarzenegger also had an uncredited cameo appearance in The Expendables.

Notes 

Sylvester Stallone
Arnold Schwarzenegger
Rivalry
1970s beginnings
1970s in American cinema
1980s in American cinema
1990s in American cinema
1990s endings